Humphreysella is a genus of ostracods within the family Thaumatocyprididae, containing 11 species. Members of this genus are filter feeders, and can range from sizes of .5 to 32 millimeters in length.

Species 
The following species are recognised in the genus Humphreysella:
 Humphreysella bahamensis (Kornicker & Iliffe, 1989)
 Humphreysella baltanasi (Kornicker in Humphreys, Kornicker & Danielopol, 2009)
 Humphreysella elizabethae (Kornicker & Iliffe, 1992)
 Humphreysella exuma (Kornicker & Iliffe, 1998)
 Humphreysella kakuki (Kornicker & Iliffe, 2000)
 Humphreysella mexicana (Kornicker & Iliffe, 1989)
 Humphreysella orghidani (Danielopol, 1972)
 Humphreysella palmeri (Kornicker, Iliffe & Harrison-Nelson, 2007)
 Humphreysella phalanx (Kornicker & Iliffe, 1995)
 Humphreysella styx (Kornicker & Iliffe, 1989)
 Humphreysella wilkensi (Hartmann, 1985)

References 

Ostracod genera
Halocyprida